A proportional tax is a tax imposed so that the tax rate is fixed, with no change as the taxable base amount increases or decreases. The amount of the tax is in proportion to the amount subject to taxation. "Proportional" describes a distribution effect on income or expenditure, referring to the way the rate remains consistent (does not progress from "low to high" or "high to low" as income or consumption changes), where the marginal tax rate is equal to the average tax rate.

It can be applied to individual taxes or to a tax system as a whole; a year, multi-year, or lifetime. Proportional taxes maintain equal tax incidence regardless of the ability-to-pay and do not shift the incidence disproportionately to those with a higher or lower economic well-being.

Flat taxes are defined as levying a fixed (“flat”) fraction of taxable income. They usually exempt from taxation household income below a statutorily determined level that is a function of the type and size of the household. As a result, such a flat marginal rate is consistent with a progressive average tax rate. A progressive tax is a tax imposed so that the tax rate increases as the amount subject to taxation increases. The opposite of a progressive tax is a regressive tax, where the tax rate decreases as the amount subject to taxation increases. 

The French Declaration of the Rights of Man and of the Citizen of 1789 proclaims:

Proportional rates 
Proportional taxes on consumption are considered by some to be regressive; that is, low-income people tend to spend a greater percentage of their income in taxable sales (using a cross section timeframe) than higher income people. A regressive tax is when the average tax rate is lower, with higher income.  So income and average tax rate have an inverse relationship. However, this calculation is derived when the tax paid is divided not by the tax base (the amount spent) but by income, which is argued to create an arbitrary relationship. The income tax rate itself is proportional, with people with higher incomes paying more tax but at the same rate.

If a consumption tax is to be related to income, the unspent income can be treated as tax-deferred (spending savings at a later point in time), at which time it is taxed creating a proportional rate using an income base. However, consumption taxes such as a sales tax can often exclude items or provide rebates in an effort to create social justice. In many locations, "necessary" items such as non-prepared food, clothing, or prescription drugs are exempt from sales tax to alleviate the burden on the poor.

Examples
 Several U.S. states impose a proportional income rate tax for individuals. These states are Colorado, Indiana, Illinois, Massachusetts, Michigan, Pennsylvania and Utah.

See also

References

Taxation and redistribution
Tax incidence